Uberto Decembrio (- 1427), secretary to the Milanese duke Giangaleazzo Visconti (+ 1402) and to Peter of Candia (later counter Pope with the name Alexander V 1409/1410). Contact to Chrysoloras during his stay in Milan (1400-1403), engagement in the translation of Greek texts.

Pier Candido Decembrio (1399 ? - 1477), son of Uberto, secretary and diplomat for the Milanese duke Filippo Maria Visconti (1392 - 1447), called a "president" of the shortliving Ambrosian republic in Milan (1447 - 1450). He was exiled after 1450 and spend some time in Naples at the court of Alfonso V. (died 1458) and in Ferrara. His tombstone notes 127 works, between them translations and biographies. 
      
Angelo Camillo Decembrio (ca. 1415 - after 1465), son of Uberto and brother of Decembrio. Spend some time in Milan and Ferrara, before leaving to Naples (1450) and then to Spain (after 1458). Major work: De politia litteraria.

External links
 Timeline with biographical dates

Italian Renaissance humanists